Lorenzo's Time is a 2012 Philippine melodrama television series starring Zaijian Jaranilla and Carmina Villaroel. The series aired on ABS-CBN's Primetime Bida evening block and worldwide on TFC from July 2, 2012 to October 5, 2012, replacing Dahil Sa Pag-ibig and was replaced by Ina, Kapatid, Anak.

Series overview

Episodes

2012

References

External links

Lorenzo's Time
2010s television-related lists